Troglonectes is a genus of troglobitic fish in the family Nemacheilidae, native to caves of Asia. Fishbase and other authorities place these species in the genus Oreonectes.

Species
There are currently 7 recognized species in this proposed genus:
 Troglonectes acridorsalis (J. H. Lan, 2013) 
 Troglonectes barbatus (X. Gan, 2013) 
 Troglonectes elongatus (L. Tang, Y. H. Zhao & C. G. Zhang, 2012) 
 Troglonectes furcocaudalis (S. Q. Zhu & W. X. Cao, 1987)
 Troglonectes macrolepis (A. M. Huang, L. N. Du, X. Y. Chen & J. X. Yang, 2009)
 Troglonectes microphthalmus (L. N. Du, X. Y. Chen & J. X. Yang, 2008)
 Troglonectes translucens (Z. L. Zhang, Y. H. Zhao & C. G. Zhang, 2006)

References

Fish of Asia
Nemacheilidae